A jungle is a dense forest in a tropical climate.

Jungle or The Jungle may also refer to:

Places 
 The Jungle (homeless encampment), a former homeless encampment in San Jose, California
 The Jungle (Seattle), a greenbelt in Seattle, Washington, U.S.
 The Jungle (Wheldon Road), a rugby league stadium in Castleford, England
 Baldwin Village, Los Angeles or The Jungles, a community in Los Angeles, California, U.S.
 'The Jungle', an area of Playa del Rey, Los Angeles
 Lawrence Heights or The Jungle, a neighborhood of Toronto, Ontario, Canada
 IUPUI Gymnasium or The Jungle, a basketball arena in Indianapolis, Indiana, U.S.
 Paul Brown Stadium or The Jungle, a football stadium in Cincinnati, Ohio, U.S.
 Calais jungle, a series of camps in the vicinity of Calais, France, where refugees and migrants live while they attempt to enter the United Kingdom

Art, entertainment and media

Film
 The Jungle (1914 film), a lost film based on the Upton Sinclair novel
 The Jungle (1952 film), an Indian film co-produced by the Modern Theatres movie studio
 The Jungle (1967 film), a 1967 short film in the National Film Registry
 Jungle (2000 film), an Indian Hindi film by Ram Gopal Varma
 Jungle (2017 film), an Australian film

Games 
 Jungle (board game), a traditional Chinese board game
 Jungle (console), video game console
 "Jungle", a Pokémon Trading Card Game set
 "Jungle", uncharted area between the lanes in multiplayer online battle arena

Literature 
 The Jungle, a 1906 novel by Upton Sinclair
 The Jungle, a 1991 novel by David Drake
 The Jungle (Cussler novel), a 2011 novel by Clive Cussler and Jack Du Brul

Radio
 "The Jungle", alternate name for The Jim Rome Show, a sports radio talk show hosted by Jim Rome

Theatre
 The Jungle (play), by Joe Robertson and Joe Murphy

Television
 "The Jungle" (The Twilight Zone), 1961 series episode
 "The Jungle" (The Killing), 2013 series episode
 Jungle, a 2003 documentary series presented by Charlotte Uhlenbroek
 "Jungles", game show episode of QI
 "Jungle", episode of The Mighty Boosh  (series 1)

Characters
 "Jungle" Jim Steele, early stage name for professional wrestler James Rocha

Music
 Jungle (band), a British modern-soul band
 Jungle Records, a British record label
 Jungle music, an electronic music genre and precursor to drum and bass
 Jungle (rapper), (Jabari Jones) member of Bravehearts

Albums
 Jungle (Jungle album), 2014
 Jungle, a 2009 album by Makoto Ozone
 Jungle, a 1984 album by Dwight Twilley
 The Jungle, a compilation album by B.B. King

Songs
 "Jungle" (Electric Light Orchestra song)
 "Jungle" (Emma Louise song)
 "Jungle" (Professor Green song), 2011
 "Jungle" (Taiji song), 2000
 "Jungle" (X Ambassadors and Jamie N Commons song), 2013
 "Jungle" (Fred Again song), 2022
 "Jungle", a song by Bliss n Eso from Circus in the Sky
 "Jungle", a song by Ivy Queen from Drama Queen
 "Jungle", a song by Kiss from Carnival of Souls: The Final Sessions
 "Jungle", a sing by Re-Flex from The Politics of Dancing
 "The Jungle", a 1967 song by B.B. King from the album of the same name
 "The Jungle", a 2009 song by Phinehas from their self-titled EP

See also 
 
 
 The Jungle Book (disambiguation)